Zeno Fernández (25 June 1940 – 7 May 2016) was a Mexican field hockey player. He competed in the men's tournament at the 1968 Summer Olympics.

References

External links
 

1940 births
2016 deaths
Mexican male field hockey players
Olympic field hockey players of Mexico
Field hockey players at the 1968 Summer Olympics